Wayne County is a county in the U.S. state of Nebraska. As of the 2010 census, the population was 9,595. Its county seat is Wayne.

In the Nebraska license plate system, Wayne County is represented by the prefix 27 (it had the 27th-largest number of vehicles registered in the state when the license plate system was established in 1922).

History
Wayne County was organized by a proclamation of Governor David Butler in the fall of 1870. As the county was settled, precincts were formed and boundaries defined. Precincts were named for officials, early settlers, and neighborhood creeks. There are 13 precincts in Wayne County.

Wayne County, like the City of Wayne, was named for Revolutionary War General Anthony Wayne.

Geography
The terrain of Wayne County consists of low rolling hills; mostly devoted to agriculture. The ground slopes to the east-northeast. A small drainage, South Logan Creek, flows east-northeastward through the central part of the county and exits flowing northeastward.

Major highways

  Nebraska Highway 15
  Nebraska Highway 16
  Nebraska Highway 35
  Nebraska Highway 57
  Nebraska Highway 98

Adjacent counties

 Dixon County – northeast
 Thurston County – east
 Cuming County – southeast
 Stanton County – south
 Madison County – southwest
 Pierce County – west
 Cedar County – north

Protected areas
 Sioux Strip State Wildlife Management Area

Demographics

As of the 2000 United States Census there were 9,851 people, 3,437 households, and 2,206 families in the county. The population density was 22 people per square mile (9/km2). There were 3,662 housing units at an average density of 8 per square mile (3/km2). The racial makeup of the county was 96.78% White, 0.94% Black or African American, 0.35% Native American, 0.35% Asian, 0.01% Pacific Islander, 0.85% from other races, and 0.72% from two or more races. 1.48% of the population were Hispanic or Latino of any race. 57.5% were of German, 6.0% Irish and 5.9% Swedish ancestry.

There were 3,437 households, out of which 30.50% had children under the age of 18 living with them, 56.20% were married couples living together, 5.40% had a female householder with no husband present, and 35.80% were non-families. 25.10% of all households were made up of individuals, and 10.60% had someone living alone who was 65 years of age or older. The average household size was 2.51 and the average family size was 3.02.

The county population contains 21.60% under the age of 18, 25.40% from 18 to 24, 21.20% from 25 to 44, 18.00% from 45 to 64, and 13.70% who were 65 years of age or older. The median age was 28 years. For every 100 females there were 92.30 males. For every 100 females age 18 and over, there were 92.30 males.

The median income for a household in the county was $32,366, and the median income for a family was $43,840. Males had a median income of $27,848 versus $20,376 for females. The per capita income for the county was $14,644. About 7.40% of families and 14.50% of the population were below the poverty line, including 10.60% of those under age 18 and 7.20% of those age 65 or over.

Communities

Cities 

 Wakefield (partial)
 Wayne (county seat)

Villages 

 Carroll
 Hoskins
 Sholes
 Winside

Unincorporated community 

 Altona

Several towns in Wayne County's early history no longer exist.  LaPorte had nearly 300 citizens at one time and was home to a temporary courthouse until the railroad chose a different route.  Towns such as Taffe, Logan City, Apex, Melvin, Weber and Spring Branch no longer exist.

Precincts
There are 13 precincts in Wayne County. They were named for officials, early settlers or neighborhood creeks.
 Brenna - named for the sister of F.E. Moses, the first settler in the precinct.
 Chapin - named for early settler Arthur T. Chapin.
 Deer Creek - named for the deer horns found on the prairies in early days.
 Garfield - named for US President James A. Garfield.
 Hancock - named for Civil War Brigadier General Winfield Scott Hancock.
 Hoskins - first named Spring Branch; later named for Mr. Hoskins who was secretary for Mr. Peavy, a member of the land company that laid out the village of Hoskins. 
 Hunter - named for early settler Cyrus E. Hunter, from Lee County IL.
 Logan - probably named for John A. Logan, the vice presidential candidate with presidential candidate James G. Blaine. 
 Leslie - either named for a pinoeer-days judge, or for a post office. 
 Plum Creek - named for wild plums seen along the creek in early days.
 Sherman - named for Civil War General.
 Strahan - named for J.M. Strahan, an early settler.
 Wilbur - named for Russell H. Wilbur, a pioneer in the precinct.

Politics
Wayne County voters have been strongly Republican for many decades, voting for the Republican candidate in every presidential election except for three from 1900 onward. In addition, no Democratic presidential candidate has won the county since 1936.

See also
 National Register of Historic Places listings in Wayne County, Nebraska

References

 
1870 establishments in Nebraska
Populated places established in 1870